Dixie Union (March 7, 1997 – July 14, 2010) was an American Thoroughbred racehorse whose wins included two Grade I stakes . He was also a successful sire whose progeny included Grade 1 winners Hot Dixie Chick, Dixie Chatter, and 2012 Belmont Stakes winner Union Rags.

Dixie Union was bred by Seattle, Washington businessman and former NBA team owner Herman Sarkowsky, who raced him in partnership with Gerald Ford's Diamond A Racing Corp. His sire was Dixieland Band, the 2004 Leading broodmare sire in North America. His dam was She's Tops, the 1992 winner of the Grade II Railbird Stakes who was a daughter of the 1986 American Champion Two-Year-Old Colt, Capote.

Trained by U.S. Racing Hall of Fame inductee Richard Mandella, at age two Dixie Union won three important stakes races in California. At age three, he won the Grade I Haskell Invitational Handicap at Monmouth Park Racetrack in Oceanport, New Jersey, and the Malibu Stakes at Santa Anita Park in Arcadia, California.

Due to a deteriorating neurological condition, Dixie Union was humanely euthanized on July 14, 2010, and was buried in the equine cemetery at Lane's End Farm where he had stood at stud.

Pedigree

References

1997 racehorse births
2010 racehorse deaths
Racehorses bred in Kentucky
Racehorses trained in the United States
Thoroughbred family 4-m